Xabier Zandio Echaide (born 17 March 1977) is a retired Spanish professional road bicycle racer who last rode for UCI ProTeam .

Biography 
Born in Pamplona, Zandio grew up in a sporting family—one brother is a footballer and another a pelota player—and decided at the age of 17 to become a cyclist rather than work for his parents' butchery business.

After a difficult 2004 season in which injuries drained him physically and emotionally, he returned with a strong performance in the 2005 Tour de France. Finishing in 22nd place overall, he managed 4th in the 18th stage, and 2nd in the 16th, behind Óscar Pereiro.

He currently resides in Pamplona and is married with two children.

Major results

2002
1st Stage 1 (TTT) Volta a Portugal
2005
1st Clásica a los Puertos de Guadarrama
6th Overall Volta a la Comunitat Valenciana
22nd Overall Tour de France
2008
1st Overall Vuelta a Burgos
2013
1st Stage 2 (TTT) Giro d'Italia
1st Stage 1b (TTT) Giro del Trentino

References

External links 

 Xabier Zandio profile at Team Sky

1977 births
Living people
Sportspeople from Pamplona
Cyclists from Navarre
Spanish male cyclists